Berezovka is a rural locality (a settlement) in Bobrovsky Selsoviet, Shipunovsky District, Altai Krai, Russia. The population was 73 as of 2013. There are 3 streets.

Geography 
Berezovka is located 35 km north of Shipunovo (the district's administrative centre) by road. Bobrovka is the nearest rural locality.

References 

Rural localities in Shipunovsky District